See also Clifford Grey, whose real name was Percival Davis.

Percival William Davis, also known as Bill Davis, is an American author, young earth creationist, and intelligent design proponent.

Education and career
In 1958, Davis received a bachelor of arts in zoology from DePauw University, in 1961 master of arts in zoology from Columbia University,  Master's degrees from Columbia University and the University of South Florida, and completed  a PhD in 1993 from the University of South Florida in Instructional Technology. Beginning in 1968, Davis was a professor of Life Science at Hillsborough Community College in Tampa, Florida but has since retired. Since 2006 he has been a visiting professor of biology at Clearwater Christian College.

Intelligent design
The term "intelligent design" came into general usage following the publishing of a 1989 book called Of Pandas and People co-authored by Davis and Dean H. Kenyon. The pair suggested that Darwinism, more than a century old, had outlived its usefulness, primarily because evolution was unable to explain all the biological complexities, which they argue show evidence of an intelligent designer. Davis additionally co-wrote "Case for Creation," with Wayne Frair, published through Chicago's Moody Bible Institute in 1983.

In a November 1994 Wall Street Journal front-page article concerning why he decided to co-author Of Pandas and People, quoted Davis saying "Of course my motives were religious. There's no question about it."

Books
Davis PW. and Frair W. A Case for Creation. 3d. rev. ed. (Chicago: Moody Press, 1983).
Davis PW., Villee C, Solomon EP. Biology (Philadelphia: W.B. Saunders, 1985).
Davis PW. and Dean H. Kenyon. Of Pandas and People. (Texas: Foundation for Thought and Ethics, 1989, 1993) 
Davis PW. and Solomon EP. Human Anatomy and Physiology. (Philadelphia: W.B. Saunders, 1983).
Davis PW. and Solomon EP. The World of Biology, 3rd Ed. Philadelphia, PA: Saunders, 1986.
 Understanding Human Anatomy and Physiology (McGraw-Hill)

References

External links
P. William Davis from Clearwater Christian College

Intelligent design advocates
American Christian Young Earth creationists
Living people
DePauw University alumni
Columbia University alumni
University of South Florida alumni
20th-century American writers
Year of birth missing (living people)